Don Bhathiyatissa Wijesurendra (තිස්ස විජේසුරේන්ද්‍ර 3 April 1949 – 11 May 2020), popularly as Tissa Wijesurendra, was a Sri Lankan actor. One of the most popular actors of the 1970s, Wijesurendra played many dramatic roles in a career spanning four decades. An innocent lover of Sinhala cinema at one time, Wijesurendra can be described as a symbol of popular cinema.

Personal life
Wijesurendra was born on 3 April 1949 in Sarikkamulla, Panadura as the eldest of the family. His father was an engineer. He was educated at Nalanda College Colombo. He qualified to become a doctor but became an actor instead.

He was married until his death to Savithri Dias Wijesurendra, a retired teacher who formerly worked at Visakha Vidyalaya. The couple had three daughters. Their daughter Surani has been involved with few television serials and has worked as a TV host. Tissa's younger brother Bandula was a photographer for Sarasavi newspaper for a long time.

Wijesurendra died on 11 May 2020, at the age of 71 while receiving treatments at Apeksha Hospital, Maharagama.

Cinema career
During school times, he stayed at an uncle's house in Bambalapitiya because it was easy to attend tuition classes. That uncle worked at Ceylon Theaters where he was selected for a film. His maiden cinema appearance came through the 1971 film Kalana Mithuro directed by Kingsley Rajapakse. It was a remake of popular Hollywood film Dosthi and the reason to cast Tissa is that he and Sudhir Sawant of Dosthi looks similar. Kingsley Rajapaksa edited the name of "Batiyathissa" to suit the cinema. Tissa was allowed to star in a feature film Nim Walalla in 1970 directed by Ranjith Lal shot by a group of students at Ananda College at the same time. This film was his first screened film.  It is the only feature film made by a group of school children. In the film, he was the brother of Swarna Mallawarachchi.

From the films he acted in, the first box office record was made by Tissa and Malani in the film Suhada Pethuma. Since then, Tissa-Malani era shaped the seventies. Since then, he acted in several popular film under the renowned directors: K.A.W. Perera, Amarnath Jayatilleke, Neil Rupasinghe and Chandraratne Mapitigama. After the film Suhada Pethuma, the two stars were lovers in the films Sadhana, Nila and Ran Kurullo, he also played the role as lover to many other film actresses like Geetha Kumarasinghe, Nita Fernando, Jenita Samaraweera in films like Sureka, Neela, Niluka, Sudu Paraviyo, Kalana Mithuro and Lasanda. His best contemporaries in the cinema were Vijaya Kumaranatunga, Gamini Fonseka and Tony Ranasinghe. Geetha Kumarasinghe first made her love affair with Wijesurendra with the film Lassana Kella. He is the only Sri Lankan actor to continue playing the protagonist in all films he acted in since the maiden film. He went on to make box office records in the Sinhala cinema history in seventies.

As the 1980s dawned, Wijesurendra's number of films began to decline. In 1983, he acted in the film Senehasaka Kandulu directed by Hemasiri Sellapperuma, where he and Sonia Disa played Veddah characters. The he acted a different role in Nelum Vile Saman Malak directed by Chandraratne Mapitigama. He expected an award for this character and it premiered in India as well. However, he did not receive the award and temporarily quit cinema after frustration.  In 1993, he played the older role as Sabeetha's father in the film Bambasara Bisaw.

Filmography

References

External links
 

 

 

2020 deaths
Sinhalese male actors
Sri Lankan male film actors
Sri Lankan Buddhists
Alumni of Nalanda College, Colombo
1949 births
20th-century Sri Lankan male actors
21st-century Sri Lankan male actors